"You're Gonna Need Me" is a 1973 soul song recorded by Dionne Warwick on her album, Just Being Myself. It was released as the b-side to the title track, which peaked at #62 on the R&B singles chart in 1973. Released during the post-Bacharach and David period of Warwick's career, the song was written and produced by Holland–Dozier–Holland, who were six years into recording their post-Motown period. The song would be revived as a hip hop sample, most notably by J Dilla on the track "Stop" on the last album he finished, Donuts, and Just Blaze, who sampled the song for Usher's 2004 single, "Throwback", off the multi-platinum album, Confessions.

1973 songs
Dionne Warwick songs
Songs written by Holland–Dozier–Holland